Keith Hopwood (born 26 October 1946) is an English pop and rock musician, singer-songwriter, composer, businessman and record producer, who served as the rhythm guitarist and backing vocals for the 1960s pop band, Herman's Hermits. Hopwood also served as a keyboardist, singer and guitarist for the post-Peter Noone outfit, Sour Mash, which recorded an unreleased album, A Whale of a Tale for RCA.

Early life
Born on 26 October 1946 at Park Hospital, Davyhulme area of Manchester, he attended Urmston Grammar School.

Career

A talented musician and composer, he continues to live and work in the music industry in the UK. Several rare demo recordings from his time in Herman's Hermits are available through his website. Peter Noone credits his old friend with coming up with the idea of recording "Mrs. Brown, You've Got a Lovely Daughter" as an afterthought, when Herman's Hermits were short of material for their first album. Noone's heavily accented delivery, together with Hopwood's muted rhythm guitar work, propelled the track to number one on the US Billboard Hot 100 chart. Contrary to many reports, the song was not an old music hall number, and the Hermits did play on the track as well as on many other Herman's Hermits records, including all of the band's number-one US and UK hits.

Ralph McTell recorded the theme tune to Cosgrove Hall Films's adaptation of The Wind in the Willows written by Hopwood and Malcolm Rowe, and this was released as a single in 1984, after the series was aired on ITV. Hopwood also co-wrote the music for Cosgrove Hall's adaptations of Terry Pratchett's Soul Music and "Wyrd Sisters" with Phil Bush. Soundtrack albums were released in 1997.

Hopwood and Rowe co-wrote and produced the music to the 1989 film adaptation of Roald Dahl's The BFG. Other Cosgrove Hall shows he composed for were Creepy Crawlies, Alias the Jester with Malcolm Rowe, Foxbusters, Andy Pandy, Discworld, with Phil Bush, and Albie, alone.

In 2004 he composed the music for the remake of Pingu for HIT Entertainment, and started work on Bob the Builder TV series and Specials, which was to last until production ceased in 2011.

In 2013 he formed a music rights company, CHF Music, with Cosgrove Hall Fitzpatrick Entertainment, the newly launched company run by Brian Cosgrove and Simon Hall, to look after all the music content for their new shows. In 2017 he started working on the series "Daisy & Ollie, starring Jason Manford, now produced by Hoopla Animation. Currently 130 episodes produced.

In 2021 he wrote and produced (along with son Dan) his first solo album Never Too Late. Containing eleven original songs this was released 1 February 2022

Pluto Music
In 1968, Keith Hopwood and Derek Leckenby founded Pluto Music, a company that composes musical scores for commercials, films, and animation. Leckenby died in 1994, but Hopwood continues operating the company. Pluto Studios has been very successful, providing services to many top acts including The Clash. Hopwood has proved himself a fine soundtrack composer, working mostly on animated television series including the hugely successful "Bob the Builder." Always a composer, he wrote and co-wrote numerous songs recorded by Herman's Hermits, and other bands such as Brinsley Schwarz. Hopwood also published and promoted the singer-songwriter, Helen Watson. He has also helped create many tracks for his granddaughter, Izzy Hopwood, who has had great musical talent from a young age.

Personal life
On 21 January 1968 Keith Hopwood married Penny Pagni, in Aberdeenshire, Scotland. They were married for 17 years and they had three children: Daxalen "Dax" (born on 5 July 1968), Joel (born in 1976) and Zhian (born in 1978).

In 1989, Hopwood married Maria Verdellis. They had a son, Daniel (born in 1991).

References

External links
Pluto Music official website
Keith Hopwood mini-bio at the IMDb website

1946 births
Living people
Rhythm and blues guitarists
English composers
English pop guitarists
English businesspeople
English male singer-songwriters
English record producers
People from Davyhulme
People educated at Urmston Grammar
Herman's Hermits members
Beat musicians